Konstantin Alekseevich Kalinin (born 17 December (29) 1889 in Warsaw, Russian Empire; died 1938 or 21 April 1940 in Voronezh) was a World War I aviator and Soviet aircraft designer.

He was born to a Russian family in Warsaw. Kalinin graduated from the Odessa Military School in 1912, the Gatchina Military Aviation School in 1916 and the Kiev Polytechnic Institute in 1925. After the Treaty of Brest-Litovsk, he became a pilot and commanding officer under Ukrainian Directory Government. He was a member of the All-Union Communist Party (bolsheviks) since 1927. In 1926, he organized and headed an aviation design bureau in Kharkiv. He designed the Kalinin K-4, Kalinin K-5, Kalinin K-7 and Kalinin K-12 aircraft.

Kalinin was executed in 1938 during the Stalinist purges. According to Soviet records, he died in 1940.

Kalinin was one of the founders and first teachers of the Kharkiv Aviation Institute. He was awarded the Order of the Red Banner of Labour.

References

1889 births
1938 deaths
1940 deaths
 
Russian aerospace engineers